The Tonkin shadow ministry was a Shadow Cabinet led by the Opposition Leader and leader of the Labor Party, John Tonkin, in the Parliament of Western Australia. While serving no formal status—only the Leader and Deputy Leader received remuneration for their role over and above that of a Member of Parliament—it was intended to improve the effectiveness of the Opposition by providing an alternative Ministry to voters, consisting of shadow ministers who could ask role-specific questions in parliament, provide comment to the media and offer alternative policies to the government in their areas of responsibility.

The Tonkin shadow ministry was the first of its kind in Western Australia, and existed from March 1974, after Labor's defeat at the 1974 state election, until 15 April 1976 when Tonkin stepped down at the age of 74. It was followed by the Jamieson shadow ministry.

The governing Ministries at the time were the Court–McPharlin Ministry and the first Court Ministry.

The Shadow Ministry 

The following members of Parliament were members of the shadow ministry:

References

Tonkin